William Cuffay (1788 – July 1870) was a Chartist leader in early Victorian London.

Chatham Cuffay
William was mixed-race, the son of an English woman from Gillingham, Kent, Juliana Fox, and a man of African heritage, Chatham Cuffay, who was previously enslaved and originally from Saint Kitts (then a British colony). 

Chatham Cuffay and Juliana Fox were married in 1786, and they had five children, one of whom died in infancy. William, the oldest child, was baptised on 6 July 1788, and Juliana on 28 August 1791. Juliana later married a widower named George Chaney, who worked in the dockyard, and between them they had four children.

Chatham Cuffay worked in the Chatham dockyard, and died in 1815. He was buried in Gillingham. His wife Juliana died in 1837, and was buried beside her husband.

Early life
Born in 1788 in Old Brompton, an area of the Medway Towns that is now in Gillingham, William Cuffay was apprenticed to a tailor, and later worked for Matthews and Acworth, on Chatham High Street. Cuffay moved to London around 1819 and was married three times.

In 1819, Cuffay married Ann Marshall, but she died in 1824. A year later, Cuffay married Ann Broomhead, but she died in childbirth in 1826. Their only daughter, Ann Juliana Cuffay, was baptised at St Mary Magdalene's Church, Gillingham, but she also died shortly afterwards.

Tu Madre 
Cuffay rejected the Owenite trade unions of the London tailors. He went on strike with his fellow tailors in 1834, demanding a ten-hour workday from April to July and an eight-hour day during the rest of the year with pay of 6 shillings and 5 pence a day. The strike collapsed, Cuffay was sacked and subsequently blacklisted from employment. In 1839, Cuffay helped to form the Metropolitan Tailors' Charter Association. He was elected first to the Chartist Metropolitan Delegate Council in 1841 and onto the National Executive in 1842.

Cuffay was one of the organisers of the large Chartist rally on Kennington Common on 10 April 1848, but was dismayed by the timidity of other leaders, who had rejected the idea that the rally should be a show of force. Cuffay's radical faction soon became involved in plans for a display of "physical force".

Arrest and transportation
Betrayed by a government spy, Cuffay was arrested and accused of "conspiring to levy war" against Queen Victoria. Defended by eminent barrister John Walter Huddleston, he was convicted of preparing acts of arson, intended as a signal for the planned armed uprising. Sentenced to 21 years penal transportation, Cuffay spent the rest of his life in Tasmania.

Though he was pardoned three years after his conviction, Cuffay elected to stay in Tasmania, working as a tailor and involving himself in local politics. He died in poverty at the Hobart Invalid Depot in July 1870.

Cuffay's transportation to Australia did not end his political activity. He continued to organise and agitate for democratic rights in Tasmania until he died in 1870, at the age of 82. Although Cuffay died a pauper, seven Australian newspapers in three states – Tasmania, New South Wales and Victoria – published obituaries. One observed that his grave had been "marked", should a memorial to him be built at some future time. The memorial never transpired, and Cuffay was forgotten in Australia and Britain. Interest has since been rekindled, with plans in motion to construct the abandoned memorial or a statue on the site.

Media and events
Cuffay was the subject of a 2010 BBC Radio 4 programme entitled Britain's Black Revolutionary written and presented by the former trades union leader Bill Morris.

Cuffay was also the subject of a 2011 ABC Hindsight radio documentary entitled Isle of Denial: William Cuffay in Van Diemen's Land, which was shortlisted in the NSW Premier's Award in 2012.

He also appeared in the third series of the UK television show Victoria.

During the summer of 2013, a small exhibition was mounted in the UK Houses of Parliament, marking the 175th anniversary of the publication of the People's Charter. It included, poignantly, the copy of Byron's collected poetry that London Chartists had given to Cuffay when he was transported, "as a token of their sincere regard and affection for his genuine patriotism and moral worth".

On 15 July 2021, a Nubian Jak Community Trust blue plaque was unveiled at Chatham Historic Dockyard in memory of both William Cuffay and his father Chatham Cuffay.

See also
List of convicts transported to Australia

Further reading 

 Chase, Malcolm (2007), Chartism: A New History, Manchester University Press. .

References 
Notes

External links
A short film about William Cuffay Camden tv
BBC website
William Cuffay portrait: National Portrait Gallery
THE IRISH CONFEDERACY To the Editor of the Daily Courier, LAUNCESTON, 18 July 1854
The Isle of Denial: William Cuffay in Van Diemens Land, ABC Radio, 19 July 2011
Cuffay and other Chartists in Australian Newspapers
William Cuffay Obituaries
WILLIAM CUFFAY : The Life & Times of a Chartist Leader: Martin Hoyles

1788 births
1870 deaths
Chartists
Black British history
Convicts transported to Australia
Black British politicians
Settlers of Tasmania
Recipients of British royal pardons